The Misfortune of Being Ned is a 2013 animated short series created by the producers of the Annoying Orange web series. The series centers on the titular character of Ned, voice acted by Steve Zaragoza, a young boy who repeatedly finds himself in unfortunate situations that usually get him killed. Having debuted as part of the Annoying Orange "Shocktober" event on October 9, 2013, the series aired every Wednesday, and ended April 23, 2014.

Characters
Ned (voiced by Steve Zaragoza) is the titular protagonist of every episode. He is last seen going into a kitchen studio to meet the Annoying Orange whom he gets annoyed by. He suddenly wants to leave the kitchen but gets erased to a single head.
Greg (voiced by Kevin Brueck) is a school bully and the main antagonist of the series
Wendy (voiced by Meghan Camarena) is Ned's girlfriend in most episodes including Ned Wins and Jet Pack.
Sketchy Dude (voiced by Bobjenz) a guy who gets Ned murdered frequently.

Episodes

Series overview

Season 1 (2013)

Season 2 (2014)
On December 18, 2013, Daneboe announced that The Misfortune of Being Ned would be renewed for a second season. The season premiered on February 19, 2014, with more episodes during the year.

References

External links
 Series playlist on YouTube

American comedy web series
YouTube original programming
2013 web series debuts
2014 web series endings
Fiction about child murder
Black comedy
Bullying in fiction
Works about children
The Annoying Orange